Donald Adam is a former New Zealand rower. 
At the 1950 British Empire Games he won the silver medal as part of the men's eight alongside crew members Kerry Ashby, Murray Ashby, Bruce Culpan, Thomas Engel, Grahame Jarratt, Don Rowlands, Edwin Smith and Bill Tinnock.

External links
 

20th-century births
Year of death missing
New Zealand male rowers
Rowers at the 1950 British Empire Games
Commonwealth Games silver medallists for New Zealand
20th-century New Zealand people
Commonwealth Games medallists in rowing
Medallists at the 1950 British Empire Games